Roy Adams (born 31 January 1989) is a South African first-class cricketer. He was part of South Africa's squad for the 2008 Under-19 Cricket World Cup.

References

External links
 

1989 births
Living people
South African cricketers
Griqualand West cricketers